Səmədxanlı may refer to:
Birinci Səmədxanlı, Azerbaijan
İkinci Səmədxanlı, Azerbaijan